Tarhouggalt (Shilha Berber: Taɣggʷalt) is a village on the southern slopes of the High Atlas mountains, in Taroudant Province, Souss-Massa Region, in Morocco. Its claim to faim is that it is the birthplace of the Shilha Berber poet Sidi Ḥammu.

Populated places in Taroudannt Province